Ecological reserves of Quebec are protected areas devoted to conservation, education and research.
They are generally closed to the public, with the exception of Serpentine-de-Coleraine, Forêt-la-Blanche des Tourbières-de-Lanoraie and Île-Brion. 
They are managed by the Ministry of Sustainable Development, Environment, Wildlife and Parks. 
According to the protected area classification of the International Union for the Conservation of Nature, Quebec's ecological reserves fall into IUCN category 1a, which is the highest level of protection in the world. 
Thus, there is no exploration or exploitation of natural resources, no roads can pass through the reserve, no energy equipment is allowed and hunting, trapping and fishing activities are prohibited.

List of ecological reserves

Reserves include:

Notes

Sources

Geography of Quebec